Steinbach Airport  is located  north of Steinbach, Manitoba, Canada.

See also
Steinbach (South) Airport

References

Registered aerodromes in Manitoba
Transport in Steinbach, Manitoba